
The following is a list of episodes of Wait Wait... Don't Tell Me!, NPR's news panel game, during 2014. Job titles of guests reflect the individuals' position at the time of their appearance. All shows, unless otherwise indicated, are taped at Chicago's Chase Auditorium, with Peter Sagal serving as host and Carl Kasell (thru May 17) and Bill Kurtis serving as announcer/scorekeeper.

January

February

March

April

May

June

July

August

September

October

November

December

References 

Wait Wait... Don't Tell Me!
Wait Wait Don't Tell Me
Wait Wait Don't Tell Me